USTS may refer to:
United States Travel Service, a defunct portion of the United States Department of Commerce
United States Treaty Series, a defunct publication of the United States Department of State